The 2016 Copa de la Reina de Fútbol was the 34th edition of the Spanish women's football national cup. It ran from 18 to 26 June 2016  and was contested by the top eight teams in the 2015–16 Primera División. Both the quarterfinals were single-elimination.

Qualification

Top eight positions of the 2015-16 Spanish First Division.

Qualified teams by community

Results

Bracket

Quarterfinals

Semifinals

Final

Goalscorers

4 goals:
 Sonia Bermúdez (Atlético de Madrid)

3 goals:
 Jennifer Hermoso (Barcelona) 

2 goals:

1 goal:

References

Women
Copa de la Reina
Copa de la Reina de Fútbol seasons